Between the Buried and Me is the debut studio album by American progressive metal band Between the Buried and Me. It was produced by Jamie King and was released on April 30, 2002 through Lifeforce Records.

Background
Between the Buried and Me formed in 2000 in Raleigh, North Carolina after the demise of metalcore bands From Here On and Prayer for Cleansing, which Rogers, Waggoner, and Goodyear had been members of. Guitarist Nick Fletcher and bassist Jason King would subsequently join the band.

In 2001, the band would record a demo featuring the songs "What We Have Become", "More of Myself to Kill" and "The Use of a Weapon"; these three songs would be re-recorded for Between the Buried and Me. After the demo's release, the band would be signed to Lifeforce Records.

About
The songs on the album demonstrate numerous concepts—one of which, the song "Arsonist", was written about their strong feelings against the Westboro Baptist Church in Topeka, Kansas, which has become well known as a controversial religious organization and hate group. The song "Fire for a Dry Mouth" was written about a former friend of the band.

A music video was released for the song "Aspirations" and was directed by Ian Larson.

This is the band's only studio album with drummer / clean vocalist Will Goodyear.

The album was re-released in 2004 by the band's then current label, Victory Records. This version was released as a enhanced CD featuring the music videos for "Aspirations" and "Mordecai". The release also came with a sampler CD featuring songs by other bands that were signed to Victory at the time.

A remixed and remastered version of the album was released in 2020 alongside remixed and remastered versions of The Silent Circus, Alaska, and Colors. The remixed and remastered version was released digitally and on vinyl through Craft Recordings.

Track listing

Personnel
Between the Buried and Me
Tommy Giles Rogers – lead vocals
Paul Waggoner – lead guitar, rhythm guitar, backing vocals
Nick Fletcher – rhythm guitar
Jason King – bass guitar
Will Goodyear – drums, clean vocals, layout, design
Production
Jamie King – production, engineering, editing, mixing
David Stith – layout, design
Alan Douches – mastering
Allison Mannerino – photography

References 

Between the Buried and Me albums
2002 debut albums
Lifeforce Records albums
Albums produced by Jamie King (record producer)